Gerd Kavlan (also Romanized as Gerd Kāvlān) is a village in Lahijan-e Gharbi Rural District, Lajan District, Piranshahr County, West Azerbaijan Province, Iran. At the 2006 census, its population was 207, in 31 families.

References 

Populated places in Piranshahr County